Sir Richard Leon Paniguian  (28 July 1949 – 25 June 2017) was a British oil industry executive with ties to British intelligence. As described in an obituary for The Telegraph, Paniguian was a long-time troubleshooter and project manager for British Petroleum in some of its most challenging territories. 

He was also notable for his involvement in negotiating the release of Abdelbaset al-Megrahi, the Libyan convicted in 2001 of organising the 1988 Lockerbie bombing.

Early life 

Paniguian's father, Hracia, known to friends as 'Pan', was a leading figure in British intelligence, a veteran of the Special Operations Executive, and an expert in psychological warfare who eventually settled into a career in advertising. He had been born in Constantinople in 1903 during the last years of the Ottoman Empire; the family name was of Armenian origin. Hracia was sent to school at Robert College and studied journalism at Columbia University, where he was friends with A. J. Liebling. In the 1930s he worked under Reginald Hoare at the British Embassy in Bucharest. The Panaguian household in South Kensington, within easy reach of several embassies, was a discreet meeting place for Hracia's French, north African, Greek and Middle Eastern contacts during and after the Second World War. 

It was also within walking distance of the Natural History Museum and Royal Albert Hall, and the young Richard often went boating in the lake of the nearby Regent's Park. Novelist Jim Powell was a childhood friend. He also had one sister, Helen.

He was schooled at The Hampshire School, Chelsea followed by Westminster, then read for a degree in Arabic at Durham University. At Durham he was a member of Hatfield College and also played rugby union 'of the coarsest variety' alongside the future Air Marshal Peter Walker for the University 4th XV. He served as Treasurer of Hatfield College JCR in 1968 and graduated with a 2:1 degree in 1971.

Career

1971–1980
After university he joined British Petroleum in 1971 as a graduate trainee in the oil trading division, and spent the first years of his career in Oman and then Dubai. He relocated to Iran in 1978, where his position as commercial representative in Tehran proved increasingly tricky with the outbreak of the Iranian Revolution. In response, he added a moustache to his 'swarthy complexion' so he could walk the streets inconspicuously. This, however, did not save him from being briefly arrested after he was found in possession of a transistor radio.

1980–2008
Moving to America in 1980, and going on to become Vice-President of International Oil Trading in New York City, he eventually served as President of BP Turkey from 1989 until 1992. He was then appointed director of BP Europe until 1995, CEO of BP Shipping until 1999, and then BP's Vice-President for the Middle East. In this role he was much occupied with the construction of the Baku–Tbilisi–Ceyhan pipeline – the world's longest – across Azerbaijan, Georgia and Turkey. On the eve of the Iraq War, he was to be found in Whitehall corridors arguing for a foothold for BP and other UK oil companies in post-conflict Iraq, amid rumours that the Americans were offering oil deals to France and Russia to secure their support for the war. In 2002, he became Group Vice-President for BP as a whole, where he stayed until his left the firm in 2008.

2008–2017

On his retirement from BP in 2008, Paniguian became head of the Defence and Security Organisation (DSO) within UK Trade and Investment, working alongside defence manufacturers in their export sales efforts. While nominally part of UKTI (now the Department for International Trade) he actually reported to the Ministry of Defence. This role made him one of the highest paid civil servants in the United Kingdom, earning a salary between £195,000-£199,000. The release of Abdelbaset al-Megrahi in 2009, demanded by Colonel Gaddafi in return for BP oil contracts and counter-terrorism assistance, meant Paniguian was well placed to answer requests from the Libyan Government for arms and military training. A month later, he gave a speech noting that 'high-level political interventions' had enhanced the prospect of arms sales to Libya. BP would later admit to pushing for the release of al-Megrahi. 

Under his stewardship DSO achieved a record of £13 billion in sales in 2013. Paniguian retired from his job with DSO in February 2015. The following year he joined the board of defence giant Raytheon.

Personal
Sir Richard was married to Lady Paniguian (Nil Okan) JP FCIL (Fellow of the Chartered Institute of Linguists), and had two stepsons, Emir and Efe. His wife, with whom he had no children of his own, became a language trainer at the Foreign and Commonwealth Office. He was for many years a member of the MCC and was known to entertain old school friends to lunch at Brooks's.

Paniguian was appointed Commander of the Order of the British Empire (CBE) in the 2007 New Year Honours and was knighted in the 2015 New Year Honours.

Sir Richard died suddenly on 25 June 2017, the cause of death being a heart attack.

References 

1949 births
2017 deaths
People educated at Westminster School, London
Alumni of Hatfield College, Durham
INSEAD alumni
BP people
British civil servants
British intelligence operatives
Commanders of the Order of the British Empire
Durham University RFC players
Knights Bachelor
British people of Armenian descent